Herbert George Baldwin (1893–1969) was a first-class cricketer and Test match umpire. Born in 1893 in Hampshire, Baldwin played 33 games for Surrey as a right-handed batsman and occasional leg break bowler with modest returns, although he was a noted fielder in the covers.

He umpired in first-class cricket for nearly three decades, including nine Tests after the war up until 1953. He called 19 no balls in 3 overs in Australia's match against Worcestershire in 1938 when fast bowler Ernie McCormick lost his run-up.

Family
Baldwin was the son of Hampshire cricketer Harry Baldwin who represented Hampshire between 1877 and 1905. Herbert, like his son, also stood as a first-class umpire.

References

External links
Herbert Baldwin
Herbert Baldwin
Matches and detailed statistics for Herbert Baldwin

1893 births
1969 deaths
People from Hart District
English cricketers
Surrey cricketers
English Test cricket umpires